Arcteonais is a genus of annelids belonging to the family Naididae.

The species of this genus are found in Eurasia and Northern America.

Species:
 Arcteonais inconstans
 Arcteonais lomondi (Martin, 1907)

References

Naididae